The 1984 West African Nations Cup was the third edition of the tournament. It was held in Burkina Faso between 11–28 November. The title was won by Nigeria.

Group stage

Third place play-off

Final

Result

References

External links
1984 West African Nations Cup - Rsssf
Statistics

West African Nations Cup
International association football competitions hosted by Burkina Faso
West
West
November 1984 sports events in Africa